Alan Gillett may refer to:

 Alan Gillett (football) (born 1948), football coach
 Alan Gillett (surveyor) (born 1930), chartered surveyor and civic dignitary